The Trumpbour Homestead Farm is a National Register of Historic Places listing located in Saugerties, New York. The property contains six buildings, including a c. 1732 vernacular stone house.

References

Houses on the National Register of Historic Places in New York (state)
Federal architecture in New York (state)
Houses completed in 1732
National Register of Historic Places in Ulster County, New York